Verbatim: The Language Quarterly was a literary magazine aimed at reporting language and linguistic issues for non-specialist readers. It was established in 1974. These matters are announced in the magazine's advertised slogan: "Language and linguistics for the layperson since 1974". The founding editor was Laurence Urdang and the final editor was Erin McKean. Verbatim was administered from Chicago, with a UK office in Chearsley, Aylesbury Vale. Until the end of the 1980s, it was distributed in the United States and Canada by the independent publisher Stein & Day.

Notes and references

Bibliography 
 "Stein & Day Publishing Files for Bankruptcy". New York Times. June 27, 1987.
 "Stein & Day To Shut Down". New York Times. July 29, 1988.

External links 
 Verbatim — official website (with some back issues up to 2004)
 Table of Contents — list of articles (author and title) by volume and number

Literary magazines published in the United States
Quarterly magazines published in the United States
Magazines established in 1974
Magazines published in Chicago